The name Sandra has been used for four tropical cyclones worldwide, three in the Eastern Pacific Ocean and one in the South Pacific.

In the Eastern Pacific:
 Hurricane Sandra (1985), a high-end Category 3 hurricane that stayed in the open ocean.  
 Hurricane Sandra (2015), a strong late-season Category 4 hurricane that dissipated just off the coast of Sinaloa.
 Tropical Storm Sandra (2021), a weak tropical storm that formed far out into sea.

In the Southwest Pacific:
 Cyclone Sandra (2013), moved into the South Pacific basin as a Severe Tropical Cyclone; its remnants bought heavy rains to parts of New Zealand.

See also 
 Hurricane Sandy, a similar name that was used once (2012) for a storm in the North Atlantic Ocean.

Pacific hurricane set index articles
Australian region cyclone set index articles